One Love is the debut studio album of American Idol contestant Kimberley Locke. According to SoundScan, total sales of the album is approximately 213,000 copies.

Critical reception

AllMusic's Stephen Thomas Erlewine noted how the record has elements of rhythmic dance pop from Kelly Clarkson's Thankful and adult contemporary from Clay Aiken's Measure of a Man, giving praise to Locke's vocal performance over a track listing that's more hook-filled than either of them, concluding that, "While that might not make for the most noteworthy of albums, it is a nice listen, and Kimberley Locke acquits herself well with this good-natured debut."

Track listing

International editions
On June 23, 2004, "One Love" was released in the Japanese market through Columbia Music Entertainment. It features the same track order as the American release, but includes two remixes of the lead single, "8th World Wonder" as bonus tracks (Hi-Bias radio edit and Elektrik Kompany radio edit).

Another version of the album was also released in the UK through London Records (and through WEA International for the rest of Europe) on August 9, 2004. It features the same songs as the original American release, however in a different order and with a different album cover.

Sales
Album (North America)

In its first week the album debuted on the Billboard 200 chart at number 16 with 56,727 copies sold.

Charts

Album

Singles

1 8th World Wonder: The Remixes maxi-single.

References

2004 debut albums
Kimberley Locke albums